Jiří Chlumský (born 4 July 1958) is a Czech director. His 2009 film Broken Promise was Slovakia's submission to the 82nd Academy Awards for the Academy Award for Best Foreign Language Film. Chlumský is married to Slovak actress Anna Šišková.

Selected filmography
 (2004)
Prachy dělaj člověka (2006)
Broken Promise (2009)
Seven Days of Sin (2012)
River Rascals (2017)

References

External links

1958 births
Living people
Film directors from Prague